Carrington V.C., also known as Court Martial in the United States, is a 1954 British legal drama film directed by Anthony Asquith and starring David Niven, Margaret Leighton and Noelle Middleton. Others in the cast include Allan Cuthbertson, Victor Maddern, Raymond Francis, Michael Bates, Laurence Naismith, Geoffrey Keen and Maurice Denham. Made by Romulus Films it was distributed by the company's Independent Film Distributors and released in the United States by Kingsley-International Pictures. It was adapted for the screen by John Hunter from the play of the same name by Campbell and Dorothy Christie. It was produced by Teddy Baird.

It was shot at Shepperton Studios near London with sets designed by the art director Wilfred Shingleton. The Victoria Cross worn by Niven in the film was that awarded to Arthur Henry Cross for service in the First World War.

Plot

Major Charles 'Copper' Carrington (David Niven), who has a distinguished Second World War record and was awarded the Victoria Cross, is arrested for embezzling £125 from his unit's safe. Other charges include leaving the base and entertaining a woman officer in his room, this being forbidden by the battalion commander Colonel Henniker (Allan Cuthbertson).

Appearing in his own defence, Carrington's case at his court-martial is that he took the money openly because of back pay owed him. The Army Paymaster had failed to pay him for expenses during postings in the Far East and his wife Valerie (Margaret Leighton) was pressuring him for money. She lives in another part of the country, and has become ill and suicidal as a result of financial worries.

Carrington claims he told his superior, Colonel Henniker, about his decision to remove the money. He transferred £100 of it to his wife's account to give her relief from her financial problems. He then left the base to compete in a major horse race in which he bet the rest of the money on himself, hoping to be able to pay back the cash taken. When he fell from his horse, his friend Captain Alison Graham (Noelle Middleton) tried to return the money, but was denied access to the safe.

As for the incident in his room, it is established that Carrington was bed-ridden from his fall and that Graham was visiting him to discuss the embezzlement. She was fully dressed and sitting on a chair when Colonel Henniker stormed in, reminding them that it was against regulations for male and female officers to be together in private quarters. Henniker admits waiting for some time between seeing Graham go to Carrington's room and then entering himself.

Henniker is in fact Carrington's enemy, resenting his war record, achievements and popularity at the base. There is an element of sympathy for Carrington's actions and it is pointed out that the Major could be cleared if established that Henniker had forewarned knowledge of his intentions. He thus perjures himself at the court-martial by denying being told by Carrington of his decision to take the money from the safe. Much of Carrington's debts were due anyway to Henniker's constant delays in pursuing the Paymaster to give Carrington the money owed him.

Due to her ill-health, Carrington did not intend to call his wife Valerie as a witness, but decided that he will have to when the case goes against him following Henniker's "evidence". She resents the idea of washing their dirty linen in public but finally agrees to turn up.

Things go wrong when Valerie becomes suspicious of Carrington's relationship with Captain Graham. Under pressure, Graham admits to Valerie that she had a one-night stand with Carrington when they became stranded in a pub in the middle of a storm. But Carrington then insisted that a full affair would not be fair to anyone, and ended it. He and Graham are now just friends.

In her evidence, Valerie also perjures herself, denying her husband ever mentioned telling Colonel Henniker he planned to take the money. Carrington produces a letter she wrote to him in which she does mention his argument with Henniker. Carrington intends to only read the parts relevant to his defence, since the letter also contains embarrassing matters about the couple and Valerie's health. But when the judge insists that he and the other officials read it before it is submitted into evidence, Carrington tears it up.

The officers who are to determine his fate have seen through the lies told in court and sympathise with Carrington. But the law finds Carrington guilty on all counts, which means dismissal from the service.

All the regular soldiers at the base are near-unanimous that it is an unfair decision. One of them, Owen (Victor Maddern), was a sergeant demoted when loyalty to Carrington resulted in his failure to co-operate with the investigation. His defiance in and out of court on the subject results in his demotion again to a mere private.

Having made his grievances public, Carrington has decided not to appeal the verdict. His marriage is also over, but, with an attitude typical of him, he puts it down to the fact that Valerie is still in love with her late husband, killed during the war, and the father of her sons.

However, in the course of gossiping about the case, a telephonist at the exchange admits overhearing Carrington's phone call with his wife and what was really said. The telephonist's testimony (if heard at the court-martial) would have provided evidence that Valerie was lying under oath.

Without Carrington knowing, as he exits the court-martial building, the other soldiers rally around and display their support for him. Moved, he decides to go along with the appeal; and there is the strong possibility that when the telephonist's evidence is heard, the verdict will be quashed and Carrington acquitted.

Cast

 David Niven as Major Charles 'Copper' Carrington VC
 Margaret Leighton as Valerie Carrington
 Noelle Middleton as Captain Alison L. Graham
 Allan Cuthbertson as Colonel Henniker
 Victor Maddern as Bombardier Owen
 Raymond Francis as Major Jim Mitchell
 Geoffrey Keen as Brigadier Ayers Meadmore, President
 Newton Blick as Judge Advocate A. Tesker Terry
 Mark Dignam as Major Morse, Prosecutor
 Robert Bishop as Prosecutor's Assistant
 Maurice Denham as Lieutenant Colonel B.R. Reeve
 Laurence Naismith as Major R.E. Panton
 Clive Morton as Lieutenant Colonel T.B. Huxford
 Michael Bates as Major A.T.M. Broke-Smith
 Stuart Saunders as Sergeant Crane
 John Chandos as Adjutant John Rawlinson
 Fred Griffiths as Fred, Soldier
 Johnnie Schofield as 	Hallam 
 Vivienne Martin as Pte. Smith 
 John Glyn-Jones as Evans, Reporter
 Timothy Bateson as 	Soldier in Naafi
 R.S.M. Brittain as Sergeant Major

Awards and nominations
Carrington, V.C. was nominated for the BAFTA Film Award for Best British Film and Best Film from any Source. David Niven was nominated for Best British Actor, and Margaret Leighton and Noelle Middleton were both nominated for Best British Actress.

References

External links
 

1954 films
British drama films
British films based on plays
British legal films
Fictional recipients of the Victoria Cross
Films directed by Anthony Asquith
Military courtroom films
Films shot at Shepperton Studios
1950s English-language films
1954 drama films
British black-and-white films
1950s British films